A  adsorber or  trap (also called Lean  trap, abbr. LNT) is a device that is used to reduce oxides of nitrogen (NO and NO2) emissions from a lean burn internal combustion engine by means of adsorption.

Purpose and function of a  adsorber
A  adsorber is designed to reduce oxides of nitrogen emitted in the exhaust gas of a lean burn internal combustion engine. Lean burn engines, particularly diesels, present a special challenge to emission control system designers because of the relatively high levels of O2 (atmospheric oxygen) in the exhaust gas. The 3-way catalytic converter that has been successfully used since the 1980s on stoichiometric engines (such as fueled by petrol, LPG, CNG, or ethanol) will not function at O2 levels in excess of 1.0%, and does not function well at levels above 0.5%. Because of the increasing need to limit  emissions from diesel engines, technologies such as exhaust gas recirculation (EGR) and selective catalytic reduction (SCR) have been used, however EGR is of limited effectiveness and SCR requires a continuous supply of reductant to the exhaust.

The  adsorber was designed to avoid the problems that EGR and SCR experienced. An adsorbant such as zeolite traps the NO and NO2 molecules — acting as a molecular sponge. Once the trap is full (like a sponge full of water) no more  can be absorbed. Various schemes have been designed to "purge" or "regenerate" the trap. One of possible reactants used to this aim is diesel fuel. Also hydrogen is a good reductant, but is dangerous and difficult to store. Some experimental systems have used fuel reformers for on-board hydrogen generation.

Market use

A  trap is used on the Volkswagen Jetta TDI and the Volkswagen Tiguan concepts. Both are projected to be introduced into the American market by 2008. They were to be marketed as part of the BlueTec program from Audi, Daimler-Chrysler, and Volkswagen.

In 2015 an ADAC study (ordered by ICCT) of 32 Euro6 cars showed that few complied with on-road emission limits, and LNT cars had the highest emissions.

Technical details
The  adsorber is based on a monolithic catalyst support that has been coated with a   adsorbing washcoat such as one containing zeolites.  Alkali/alkaline oxide (carbonate) can also be used as the adsorbant.

It necessitates a periodic high temperature regeneration that tends to reduce the adsorber's operating life.

References

Engine technology
Gas technologies